Krameria bicolor is a perennial shrub or subshrub of the family Krameriaceae, the rhatanies. It is commonly known as white rhatany, crimson-beak, and chacate in Spanish (cosahui in the state of Sonora). It is found in drier environments of the southwestern United States from California to Texas, and in northern Mexico.

The branches are spiny in form but not sharp nor firm at the tips. The leaves are grey-green to greenish, finely-haired, narrow and only one half to three quarters of an inch long.

The color of the plant and branches is grayish-green to gray, or whitish-gray, to dull browns or tinged with red. The flowers are often sparse and sometimes inconspicuous, but plants in some locales can bloom prolifically in red flowers. The plant is used for dyes in the basketry of Seri people in Mexico.

The shrub is adapted to dry, desert environments, but it can take advantage of high soil moisture. The plant is partially parasitic, for example on creosote bush, Larrea tridentata.

References

Jepson Flora Project: Krameria grayi
USDA: NRCS: Plants Profile Krameria grayi; Photo-High Res--(Close-up) - (Photo of Flowers, Spines, & Leaves)
Images from the CalPhotos archive
Krameria grayi at LBJ Wildflower Center

bicolor
North American desert flora
Flora of Northwestern Mexico
Flora of the Southwestern United States
Flora of the California desert regions
Flora of the Chihuahuan Desert
Flora of the Sonoran Deserts
Flora of Arizona
Flora of New Mexico
Flora of Sonora
Flora of Texas
Natural history of the Colorado Desert
Natural history of the Mojave Desert
Plants described in 1886
Flora without expected TNC conservation status